Ali Hasan-e Olya (also Romanized as ‘Alī Ḩasan-e ‘Olyā) is a village in Sanjabi Rural District, Kuzaran District, Kermanshah County, Kermanshah Province, Iran. At the 2006 census, its population was 46, in 11 families.

References 

Populated places in Kermanshah County